Coleophora latronella is a moth of the family Coleophoridae. It is found in Canada, including Nova Scotia.

The larvae feed on the seeds of Juncus species. They create a trivalved, tubular silken case.

References

latronella
Moths described in 1940
Moths of North America